Barnstaple by-election may refer to:

 1880 Barnstaple by-election
 1910 Barnstaple by-election
 1911 Barnstaple by-election

Disambiguation pages